Intelligence is a bimonthly peer-reviewed academic journal of psychology that covers research on intelligence and psychometrics. It is published by Elsevier and is the official journal of the International Society for Intelligence Research. The journal was established in 1977 by Douglas K. Detterman (Case Western Reserve University). The editor-in-chief is Richard J. Haier.

According to the New Statesman in 2018, the "journal Intelligence is one of the most respected in its field" but has allowed its reputation "to be used to launder or legitimate racist pseudo-science". Smithsonian Magazine called it "a more respected psychology journal", but stated that it has "occasionally included papers with pseudoscientific findings about intelligence differences between races." It has been criticized for having included on its editorial board biochemist Gerhard Meisenberg and psychologist Richard Lynn, both of whom are promoters of eugenics and scientific racism. The editor-in-chief of the journal defended their involvement on the basis of academic freedom. Lynn and Meisenberg no longer serve in the editorial board as of 2018.

Abstracting and indexing 
The journal is abstracted and indexed in Psychological Abstracts/PsycINFO, Child Development Abstracts and Bibliography, Current Index to Journals in Education, Scopus, and Sociological Abstracts. According to the Journal Citation Reports, its 2020 impact factor was 2.77.

References

External links
 

Bimonthly journals
Cognition
Differential psychology journals
Elsevier academic journals
English-language journals
Intelligence journals
Personality journals
Publications established in 1977
Race and intelligence controversy